District No. 2 School, Caroline and Dryden, now Caroline Town Hall, is a historic school building located at Slaterville Springs in Tompkins County, New York. It was built in 1869 and is a two-story, 30 feet wide by 50 feet deep, frame structure with a partial basement. The first floor housed grades one through eight, while the second floor accommodated high school classes.  The building was used as a school until 1957 and is now used as the town hall.

It was listed on the National Register of Historic Places in 2005.

References

School buildings on the National Register of Historic Places in New York (state)
School buildings completed in 1869
Buildings and structures in Tompkins County, New York
1869 establishments in New York (state)
National Register of Historic Places in Tompkins County, New York